State Route 145 (SR 145) is a relatively short north–south highway in Middle Tennessee. The road begins in Woodbury and ends in Auburntown.

Route description

SR 145 begins at an intersection with US 70S/SR 1 in Woodbury just west of downtown. The highway goes northward as Auburntown Road to pass through a narrow valley before entering mountainous terrain of the Highland Rim. SR 145 continues north through the mountains before entering another valley. It passes through more farmland before entering Auburntown, where it becomes Woodbury Road. SR 145 then enters downtown and turns northeast for a short time as East Main Street, the former alignment of SR 96 through downtown, before coming to its northern terminus at SR 96.

Major intersections

See also

References 

145
Transportation in Cannon County, Tennessee